John Gooch may refer to:
Johnny Gooch (1897–1975), baseball player
Tiny Gooch (1903–1986), American all-round athlete
John Gooch (priest) (1752–1823), Anglican priest
John Viret Gooch (1812–1900), locomotive superintendent of the London and South Western Railway
Sir (Richard) John Sherlock Gooch, 12th Baronet (1930–1999) of the Gooch baronets
John Gooch (mayor), mayor of Shreveport, Louisiana
Jon Gooch (born 1984), DJ and musician